Alejandro Ramón Maciel (born 22 April 1997) is an Argentine professional footballer who plays as a centre-back for Banfield on loan from Talleres.

Career
Maciel began with Sportivo Eldorado, before joining Boca Juniors. In August 2016, Maciel joined Talleres' academy on loan. The deal was made permanent in January 2018, with Maciel joining as part of the transfer that took Emanuel Reynoso to Boca Juniors. He was promoted into Talleres' senior squad from December 2017, being an unused substitute for fixtures with Colón, Defensa y Justicia and Gimnasia y Esgrima in the 2017–18 Primera División campaign. On 22 June 2018, Maciel was loaned to Primera B Nacional's Santamarina. After an ankle injury, his pro bow came in March 2019 versus Almagro.

Maciel spent the 2019–20 campaign on loan with Villa Dálmine, scoring once in twenty-one appearances.

After a loan spell at Central Córdoba SdE from October 2020 until the end of 2021, Maciel signed a one-year loan deal with Banfield.

Career statistics
.

References

External links

1997 births
Living people
Sportspeople from Misiones Province
Argentine footballers
Association football defenders
Primera Nacional players
Talleres de Córdoba footballers
Club y Biblioteca Ramón Santamarina footballers
Villa Dálmine footballers
Central Córdoba de Santiago del Estero footballers
Club Atlético Banfield footballers